Berrien County Courthouse is the historic courthouse for Berrien County, Georgia. It is located in the Town Square of Nashville.

The first Berrien County Courthouse was a two-story log building built on this site in 1858. The present structure dates from 1898. It was added to the National Register of Historic Places on December 9, 1977.

See also
Berrien County Jail
National Register of Historic Places listings in Berrien County, Georgia

References

External links
 

Courthouses on the National Register of Historic Places in Georgia (U.S. state)
Former county courthouses in Georgia (U.S. state)
Buildings and structures in Berrien County, Georgia
National Register of Historic Places in Berrien County, Georgia
Government buildings completed in 1898
1898 establishments in Georgia (U.S. state)